The Goss Ministry was a Ministry of the Government of Queensland, led by Labor Premier Wayne Goss. It commenced on 7 December 1989, five days after the Cooper Ministry, led by Premier Russell Cooper of the National Party, was defeated at the 1989 election. The Goss Ministry was followed by the Borbidge Ministry on 19 February 1996 following the loss by Labor of the Mundingburra by-election two weeks earlier, which deprived the Government of its majority.

First Ministry
On 7 December 1989, a ministry of 18 cabinet ministers was sworn in. It served until the reconstitution of the Ministry on 16 December 1991 following the departure of Terry Mackenroth and Ken McElligott from the Ministry.

The list below is ordered by decreasing seniority within the Cabinet, as indicated by the Government Gazette and the Hansard index.

First Ministry (reconstituted)
The following served from 16 December 1991 until the new Ministry was constituted on 24 September 1992 after the 1992 election:

Second Ministry
On 24 September 1992, a ministry of 18 cabinet ministers was sworn in. It served until a major redistribution of portfolios on 21 February 1995.

The list below is ordered by decreasing seniority within the Cabinet, as indicated by the Government Gazette and the Hansard index.

Second Ministry (reconstructed)
On 21 February 1995, a reshuffle of portfolios took place after Pat Comben's departure from the ministry to resume his studies and enter the Anglican Church, with Warren Pitt being appointed in his place. The ministers below served until a new Ministry was constituted on 31 July 1995 following the 1995 election.

Third Ministry
On 31 July 1995, a new ministry of 18 cabinet ministers was sworn in, returning Ken McElligott to the ministry and replacing four who had retired at the election. It served until the defeat of the Government in a vote of no-confidence on 19 February 1996 following the Mundingburra by-election.

References
 All information about ministries was sourced from Ministries from December 1989, extracted from the Queensland Parliamentary Handbook.
 All information about events was sourced from the "Australian Political Chronicle" in various instalments of the Australian Journal of Politics and History.

Queensland ministries
Australian Labor Party ministries in Queensland